Slovenské elektrárne, a.s. is an electric utility company based in Bratislava, Slovak Republic, and successor to the former state monopoly.  It operates nuclear, hydroelectric and fossil fuel power plants. Since July 2016, 66% of Slovenské elektrárne's shares is owned by Slovak Power Holding BV, a company founded and 50:50 percent controlled by the Czech industrial group Energetický a průmyslový holding and the Italian energy company Enel.

Business agreements
Slovenské elektrárne has signed a business agreement with Consorzio Paleocapa on September 12, 2010, for future collaboration in fossil fuel power plants operation in Italy and Slovakia.

References

External links
 Official website (English)

Electric power companies of Slovakia